Husband Run is a  long 1st order tributary to Oil Creek in Venango County, Pennsylvania.  This is the only of this name in the United States. Husband Run flows most of its distance through Oil Creek State Park.

Course
Husband Run rises about 1 mile south of Shamburg, Pennsylvania and then flows west-southwest to join Oil Creek about 1.5 miles southwest of Shamburg.

Watershed
Husband Run drains  of area, receives about 45.1 in/year of precipitation, has a wetness index of 404.49, and is about 96% forested.

See also
 List of rivers of Pennsylvania

References

Additional Maps

Rivers of Pennsylvania
Rivers of Venango County, Pennsylvania